1938 Emperor's Cup Final was the 18th final of the Emperor's Cup competition. The final was played at Meiji Jingu Gaien Stadium in Tokyo on June 19, 1938. Waseda University won the championship.

Overview
Waseda University won the championship, by defeating Keio University 4–1. Waseda University was featured a squad consisting of Sei Fuwa, Sekiji Sasano, Kunitaka Sueoka, Shogo Kamo and Hidetoki Takahashi.

Match details

See also
1938 Emperor's Cup

References

Emperor's Cup
1938 in Japanese football